Blandine Yaméogo (born 1960), is a Burkinabé actress. She has acted in critically acclaim films La nuit de la vérité, Delwende and Notre étrangère. Apart from filmmaking, she is also a choreographer and composer.

Filmography

References

External links
 

Living people
Burkinabé women
Burkinabé actors
1960 births
21st-century Burkinabé people